This is a list of Gabonese provinces by Human Development Index as of 2021.

Note: Libreville (capital of Gabon and Estuaire Province) and Port Gentil (capital of Ogooué-Maritime Province and second-largest city) are grouped and have their own HDI.

References 

Gabon
Human Development Index
Provinces By Human Development Index
HDI